Exoryza is a genus of braconid wasps in the family Braconidae. There are about 15 described species in Exoryza, found throughout most of the world.

Species
These 15 species belong to the genus Exoryza:

 Exoryza asotae (Watanabe, 1932)
 Exoryza belippicola (Liu & You, 1988)
 Exoryza hylas (Wilkinson, 1932)
 Exoryza mariabustosae Fernandez-Triana, 2016
 Exoryza megagaster (de Saeger, 1944)
 Exoryza minnesota Mason, 1981
 Exoryza monocavus Valerio & Whitfield, 2004
 Exoryza oryzae (Walker, 1994)
 Exoryza reticarina Song & Chen, 2003
 Exoryza richardashleyi Fernandez-Triana, 2016
 Exoryza ritaashleyae Fernandez-Triana, 2016
 Exoryza rosamatarritae Fernandez-Triana, 2016
 Exoryza safranum Rousse & Gupta, 2013
 Exoryza schoenobii (Wilkinson, 1932)
 Exoryza yeimycedenoae Fernandez-Triana, 2016

References

Further reading

 
 
 

Microgastrinae